Myšák (Czech feminine: Myšáková) or Mysak are surnames which may refer to the following notable people:
 Denis Myšák (born 1995), Slovak sprint canoeist
 Jan Myšák (born 2002), Czech ice hockey centre 
 Lawrence A. Mysak (born 1940), Canadian applied mathematician
 Lubomír Myšák (born 1979), Czech football player
 Roman Mysak (born 1991), Ukrainian football goalkeeper

See also
 
Mišak

Czech-language surnames
Ukrainian-language surnames